Alberta Hospital Edmonton is a psychiatric hospital operating under the governance of Alberta Health Services. It is located in the northeastern portion of Edmonton, Alberta, Canada, and was founded on July 1, 1923. The site is serviced by Edmonton Transit Service bus route 121.

Admission and continuing treatment at Alberta Hospital Edmonton can be voluntary, formal under the Mental Health Act, or in the Forensic Psychiatry Program under the Criminal Code. Referral agents include physicians, mental health professionals, other health care facilities, community agencies, courts, corrections, police, and family, in addition to self-referral.

Each Alberta Hospital Edmonton program has an inpatient and a community component. Interdisciplinary teams are made up of program managers, psychiatrists, psychologists, psychometrists, nurses, psychiatric aides, social workers, occupational therapists, recreation therapists, physiotherapists, therapy assistants, counselors, pharmacists, dietitians, chaplains and support staff.

History

Grand Opening
Opened Sunday, July 1, 1923, as the "Provincial Mental Institute, Oliver". For many years, it was a World War I veterans hospital. The first 47 patients arrived in the summer of 1923 from the "Hospital for Returned Soldiers" (later known as Michener Centre) in Red Deer. All 47 patients were veterans of World War I who were mostly suffering from "shell shock," now known as Post-traumatic stress disorder (PTSD). The first physician caring for these veterans was Captain Dr. David L. Dick. He served with the Royal Army Medical Corps 142nd Field Ambulance in 1915-16 on the Western Front. In 1917, he was transferred to the Canadian Expeditionary Force and became Resident Medical Officer for the Strathcona Military Hospital, Edmonton. 
The Grand Opening was a significant event as these were veterans and the official hostess of the occasion was Bridget Velma Henderson, niece of Premier Herbert Greenfield, who later married World War I flying ace Stanley A. Puffer of the Royal Flying Corps. At the Grand Opening, luminaries in attendance included:
Dick Reid. the Minister of Health
Archie Matheson, the MLA from Vegreville
John Edward Brownlee, the Attorney-General

Recent History
In August 2009, Alberta Health Services announced that it will be closing 106 of the 410 beds at the hospital. The AUPE has been strongly opposed to the closures and have staged many protests and have made several television commercials at an attempt to gain support.

Buildings
The buildings on the site were named numerically in the order in which they were built originally but now the order has no relevance.

1 Building

Originally the first dormitory
contained the apparel shop and Highwood School until closed in 2006

2 Building
Remains standing, but unused. It used to be a supplementary dormitory where numerous patients were also treated.

Old 3 Building
Contained 2 units 3B and 3C
Demolished and replaced with current 3 building

3 Building
Helen Hunley Forensic Pavilion
Contains X-ray and CT scanning equipment
Dorran Auditorium
Pool and gymnasium

4 Building
Original building demolished, new building used as new food services which replaces old 17 building 
formerly held patients; following closure for patient care, became a dormitory for staff

5 Building
Rose Sinclair Pavilion
Not in use but still standing. Used to be the old Forensic Pavilion until Forensic Psychiatric Services moved to the now 3 Building.

6 Building
Laundry

7 Building
Woodwork shop
Unused as building is condemned

8 Building
Rachel H. Young Pavilion
Contains Rehabilitation units; including the Specialized Treatment, Assessment and Rehabilitation Services (S.T.A.R.S.)
Contains Budz Bistro (coffee shop run by patients as part of a patient program, but is now not in operation)

9 Building

Contains library, pharmacy, pastoral/spiritual care, AV and computer lab
Contains Central Services, Highwood School and Apparel Shop
Contains Provincial Protective Services Communications Center
Contains the Parking Call Centre for Alberta Health Services.

10 Building
AD MacPherson Pavilion
Houses Admitting and is part of the Adult Psychiatric Program.
Contains 4 separate adult psychiatry units: unit 10-1, 10-1A, 10-2, and 10-2A
unit 10-1 is an adult psychiatric intensive care unit

11 Building
Cottonwood
Remains standing but unused

12 Building
AR Schrag
ECT therapy
Geriatric units used to reside here however have been moved to Villa Caritas.
 Now has a young adults unit (12A) and the adult day hospital on the main floor of the building
 During the COVID-19 pandemic, adult acute psychiatry programs from the Royal Alexandria and University of Alberta Hospitals were redeployed to the upstairs floor of 12 building (units 12B and 12C) to accommodate COVID-19 units at their respective hospitals. At present, the University of Alberta adult acute psychiatry program resides in 12B&C

14 Building
 Now demolished and replaced by a new Food Services building.

15 Building

Administration and HR

16 Building
Used to function as a Fire Hall when AHE had its own fire department, but has been since converted into a car wash, framing shop and bottle depot. 16 Building is run by staff but staffed by patients, who are taking part in patient programs.

17 Building
Food and Nutrition Services, decommissioned for patient foods and replaced with new building 4 but maintained the cafeteria area.
Sunshine Cafe 

18 Building
Power plant

19 Building
Facilities management offices

20 Building
Greenhouse and RSVP gift shop
Originally patients were paid a small stipend for working in the greenhouse. However, this is no longer funded. In March 2016 a fire broke out and the building has sustained severe damage and is to be demolished. Temp greenhouse has been erected.

21 Building
Stores/Receiving
Patient Transportation
Regional Surplus
Cameron Hall
Demolished

Water Tower
Due to its height, this structure is visible throughout the Alberta Hospital site and to the outlining area.

Programs
Adult psychiatry (Ages 18–65)
CLiP (The Community Living Program) provides support to psychiatric patients within the community upon discharge from the hospital
The Northern Alberta Forensic Psychiatry Program
Young Adults Acute Unit

Notable patients
Allyson McConnell (Australian woman who killed her two children in Millet, Alberta)

References

Alberta Hospital Edmonton 1923-1983, Published by AHE, Printed by ABC Press 1979 Ltd.

Hospital buildings completed in 1923
Psychiatric hospitals in Canada
Hospitals in Edmonton
Hospitals established in 1923
1923 establishments in Alberta